is a Japanese novel written by Megumi Hatakenaka and published in 2007.  A sequel, titled , was published in 2013.  An anime television series adaptation premiered from July to October 2018. Crunchyroll is streaming the series under the title We Rent Tsukumogami.

Plot
Okō and Seiji own and run the Izumo-ya lending shop in the Fukagawa district of Edo. Several of the items they lend are old and have become tsukumogami. Seiji is clever and, with the help of the tsukumogami, has a reputation for being able to solve mysteries and other difficult problems. One of those mysteries is the whereabouts of Satarō, a man who was once interested in Okō despite being engaged to another woman.

Characters
 
 
 Okō's younger brother
 
 
 Seiji's older sister
 
 
 heir to the Iida-ya shop
 
 
 a bat-shaped netsuke tsukumogami
 
 
 a full moon kakemono tsukumogami
 
 
 a kiseru tsukumogami
 
 
 a princess doll tsukumogami
 
 
 a comb tsukumogami
 Narrator

Media

Novel
The novel is written by Megumi Hatakenaka, and Kadokawa Shoten published it on September 25, 2007.  A second edition was published on June 23, 2010.  Hatakenaka published a sequel, titled Tsukumogami, Asobō yo, on March 26, 2013, and the second edition was published on April 23, 2016.

Anime
NHK announced an anime television series adaptation on October 23, 2017.  The series is directed by Masahiko Murata and written by Kento Shimoyama, with animation by studio Telecom Animation Film.  Miho Yano and Hiromi Yoshinuma are designing the characters based on the original designs by Lily Hoshino.  Natsue Muramoto serves as the series' art director, Ryoko Oka provides color design, Yūko Kamahara is the director of photography, and Yasunori Ebina serves as sound director.  Music for the series is composed by Gō Satō. "Miyavi vs. Kavka Shishido performed the opening theme song, and Mai Kuraki performed the ending theme song.  TMS Entertainment produced the anime. Anime Limited acquired the series for distribution in the United Kingdom and Ireland.

The series premiered on NHK General TV from July 22 to October 14, 2018.

References

External links
  at Kadokawa Shoten 
  
 

2007 Japanese novels
2013 Japanese novels
Anime and manga based on novels
Kadokawa Shoten
Kadokawa Dwango franchises
NHK original programming
TMS Entertainment